Andrew "Andy" Wilson (born 5 October 1963) is an English former professional rugby league footballer who played in the 1980s and 1990s. He is Assistant Coach at Yorkshire Amateur Rugby League side Queens ARLFC of Leeds, who play in the Unison Premier Division.

Background
Andy Wilson was born in Leeds, West Riding of Yorkshire, England.

Playing career

County Cup Final appearances
Andy Wilson played , i.e. number 5, in Wakefield Trinity's 8–11 defeat by Castleford in the 1990–91 Yorkshire County Cup Final during the 1990–91 season at Elland Road, Leeds on Sunday 23 September 1990, and played  in the 29–16 victory over Sheffield Eagles in the 1992–93 Yorkshire County Cup Final during the 1992–93 season at Elland Road, Leeds on Sunday 18 October 1992.

References

External links
Wakefield Trinity V Australia 1990
(archived by web.archive.org) Andy Wilson interview at wakefieldwildcats.co.uk
(archived by web.archive.org) Queens Topple Favourites in Top Game

1963 births
Living people
English rugby league players
Huddersfield Giants players
Rugby league players from Leeds
Rugby league wingers
Wakefield Trinity players